The Jupiter grape is an interspecific seedless Muscat grape developed at the University of Arkansas in 1998. It is a cross of Arkansas 1258 x Arkansas 1762. The Muscat flavor comes from “Gold” (vitis vinifera) variety; the seedlessness comes from “Reliance” (vitis labrusca) variety.  Contains V. labrusca and V. vinifera. This grape variety is patented by the University of Arkansas.

Jupiter has large, oval blue-purple berries on large clusters. Its skins are not too tough or too tart to impede its desirability as a table grape. It has mild but pleasant flavor and a pronounced flowery "Muscat-type" aromatic profile that carries through in wines made from it. It can be trained to an upright growth habit. The grape has moderate-to-strong resistance to fungal diseases, and can be grown successfully in climates as different as the South and the Pacific Northwest. The variety can attain 21 Brix in sugars and can reach a high yield of approximately 8-13 tons per acre, making it a potentially valuable cash crop. On the negative side, in SW Washington State, it suffers from poor summer drought resistance (on an especially dry, well-drained single site location - perhaps that site is not suitable for commercial viticulture) even with some supplemental irrigation, and from cluster shatter during automated mechanical harvest.

References 

The Grape Grower: A Guide to Organic Viticulture, by Lon Rombough

Hybrid Grape Analysis for the Pacific Northwest, by Kenton Erwin, 2012

Table grape varieties
Food and drink introduced in 1998